Jumping is a 1986 Belgian comedy film directed by Jean-Pierre De Decker. The film was selected as the Belgian entry for the Best Foreign Language Film at the 59th Academy Awards, but was not accepted as a nominee.

Cast
 Herbert Flack as Axel Woestewey
 Mark Verstraete as Pieter Paul 'Pipo' Himmelsorge
 Maya van den Broecke as Bellina Woestewey

See also
 List of submissions to the 59th Academy Awards for Best Foreign Language Film
 List of Belgian submissions for the Academy Award for Best Foreign Language Film

References

External links
 

1986 films
1986 comedy films
Belgian comedy films
1980s Dutch-language films